Stonehenge Apocalypse is a 2010 Canadian made-for-TV science fiction film starring Misha Collins, Torri Higginson and Peter Wingfield. The movie follows a series of deaths, natural disasters, and strange energy readings that seem to be mysteriously connected to Stonehenge.

Plot
An ancient prophecy comes to pass when archaeologists unearth an Egyptian chamber 10,000 feet below ground in Maine USA, sparking a devastating electromagnetic pulse that triggers Stonehenge and, in turn, sends destructive shockwaves around the globe.

When the Aztec pyramids crumble and the stones take on a life of their own, a renegade radio host, a team of scientists, and a team of British commandos race to prevent the same force responsible for creating life on Earth from cleansing the planet in order to herald the dawn of a new age.

Cast
 Misha Collins as Dr. Jacob Glaser, a once-renowned astrophysicist, now written off as a crazed conspiracy theorist by most of the scientific community (possibly because he believes metal can be radio-carbon dated). He runs a radio show called The Real Story in which he discusses unexplained phenomena with his listeners.
 Torri Higginson as Dr. Kaycee Leeds.
 Peter Wingfield as Dr. John Trousdale.
 Hill Harper as Dr. Joseph LeShem, a former friend and colleague of Dr. Glaser's, discoverer of the chamber in Maine.

Reception
Stonehenge Apocalypse drew 2.1 million viewers during its premiere.

References

External links
 

2010 television films
2010 films
English-language Canadian films
Syfy original films
2010 science fiction films
Canadian disaster films
CineTel Films films
Disaster television films
2010s disaster films
Canadian science fiction television films
Films directed by Paul Ziller
2010s Canadian films
2010s American films